Rock is the third studio album by French nu metal band Pleymo. Released on 27 October 2003, the album sees the band shifting towards a more melodic musical style which is less aggressive than their previous releases. Rock is a concept album about a four-year-old blind boy and his imaginary twin.

Music style and album concept 
With the recording of Rock, Pleymo sought to shift their music toward a more melodic and less aggressive style than their previous albums. The band also wrote the songs to form a concept album about a boy, blind and four years of age, and his imaginary double.

Release 
A music video for the album's title track was released in 2005. A variant edition of the album contained a bonus DVD featuring live concert footage and music videos.

Legacy 
The songs "Divine Excuse", "Polyester Môme", "1977", "Modaddiction", "Rock", and "Cherubin" were included on the band's 2005 live album, Ce Soir C'Est Grand Soir.

Track listing 
Le Voyage de Rock - 1:30
Rock - 3:20
1977 - 4:17
Divine Excuse - 3:30
L'insolent - 3:21
Modaddiction - 4:12
Sommes Nous? - 3:24
Zorro - 2:54
Polyester Mome - 3:42
Une Vie de Details - 3:46
Cherubin - 3:03
Anemia - 3:34
Kongen (ft. Enhancer) - 3:50
Laugh Calvin - 10:37
Total length: 55:00

Track 14 is in fact during 4:35 then after a silence of 2 minutes start an hidden track.

Personnel 

Mark Maggiori (Kemar): Vocals
Erik Devilloutreys (Riko): Guitar
Davy Portela (Vost): Guitar
Benoit Juillard (B1): Bass
Fred Ceraudo (Burns): Drums
Frank Bailleul (Kefran): DJ

References 

2003 albums
Pleymo albums